Birendra Kumar Sinha also known as Birendra Yadav is an Indian politician. He was elected to the Bihar Legislative Assembly from Obra as a Member of Bihar Legislative Assembly and a member of the Rashtriya Janata Dal in 2015.

References

1968 births
Living people
People from Aurangabad district, Bihar
Bihar MLAs 2015–2020
Rashtriya Janata Dal politicians
Magadh University alumni